Galti Se Mis-Tech is a 2018 Hindi short web series, created by Ekta Kapoor for her video on demand platform ALTBalaji. The web series is about a happily sorted couple who love each other company until a series of technological glitches turn their bond into small fights.</ref>

The series is available for streaming on the ALT Balaji App and its associated websites since its release date.

Plot
The series revolves around Shivam and Dhara, a generation Y couple with technology in their DNA. Their cute and fun relationship thrives on technologies and smartphones. They are sorted out and enjoy their company until a series of technological glitches turn their lovely bond into a complete madhouse. The series explores how the two of them go through this journey of technological savvy world with their cute fights.

Cast
 Anita Hassanandani as Dhara Sehgal
 Rithvik Dhanjani as Shivam Chaturvedi

List of Episodes
 Episode 1: Say Cheese
 Episode 2: Bhadwa Baigan
 Episode 3: I Wanna Exercise
 Episode 4: Thodi Cute Thodi Sweet
 Episode 5: Daru Daru Daru
 Episode 6: Hangover
 Episode 7: Happy & Gay
 Episode 8: Chaddi Ki Shaadi
 Episode 9: Bangkok Calling
 Episode 10: Season Finale: I am Hungry

Awards

References

External links
 Watch Galti Se Mis-Tech on ALT Balaji website
 

2018 web series debuts
Hindi-language web series
ALTBalaji original programming
Indian comedy web series